Moufflon Publications is an independent press based in Nicosia, Cyprus founded in 1967 by Jirayr Keshishian, and named after the Cyprus Moufflon, an endangered goat species. It is a specialist publisher producing high-quality titles covering a range of subjects with connections to Cyprus and the Eastern Mediterranean.

External links

news.moneycentral.msn.com

Publishing companies of Cyprus
1967 establishments in Cyprus
Publishing companies established in 1967
Companies based in Nicosia